The third season of the American television drama series Masters of Sex premiered on July 12, 2015, and concluded on September 27, 2015, consisting of 12 episodes. Showtime broadcast the third season on Sundays at 10:00 pm (ET) in the United States.

The series was developed for television by Michelle Ashford and is based on the biography Masters of Sex: The Life and Times of William Masters and Virginia Johnson, the Couple Who Taught America How to Love by Thomas Maier. Masters of Sex tells the story of Dr. William Masters (Michael Sheen) and Virginia Johnson (Lizzy Caplan), two pioneering researchers of human sexuality at Washington University in St. Louis. The third season takes place between 1965 and 1968.

Cast

Main
 Michael Sheen as Dr. William Masters (12 episodes)
 Lizzy Caplan as Virginia Johnson (12 episodes)
 Caitlin FitzGerald as Libby Masters (12 episodes)
 Annaleigh Ashford as Betty Dimello (11 episodes)

Recurring

Guests
 Maggie Grace as Dr. Christine Wesh (1 episode)
 Judy Greer as Alice Logan (1 episode)
 Eric Lange as David Buckland (1 episode)
 Necar Zadegan as Queen of Iran (1 episode)
 Waleed Zuaiter as Mohammad, Shah of Iran (1 episode)

Production
The series was renewed for a 12-episode third season on August 20, 2014, by Showtime. In March 2015, Allison Janney confirmed she would return for the third season in a multi-episode arc, and Beau Bridges was also confirmed to be returning by series developer Michelle Ashford. Series regular Teddy Sears, who portrays Austin Langham, returned in a recurring role for the third season. In April 2015, it was reported that Maggie Grace would guest star in an episode, playing a gynecologist. Isabelle Fuhrman was cast in a recurring role, playing Virginia's daughter, Tessa; Fuhrman took over the role from Kayla Madison, who played the character for the first two seasons. In May 2015, several recurring roles were announced, including Josh Charles, Tate Donovan, Julie Ann Emery, and that Heléne Yorke would return as Jane Martin in a recurring role after only appearing once in season 2 due to Yorke's unavailability. In June 2015, it was announced that Sarah Silverman would reprise her role as Helen for a multi-episode arc in season 3. In July 2015, it was announced that Emily Kinney was cast in a recurring role as Nora. 

The season premiere was released online on YouTube and Showtime's official website on July 2, 2015. The episode, however, is censored for content, including strong language and nudity.

Episodes

Reception

Critical response 
The third season has received generally positive reviews from critics. It has a Metacritic score of 72 out of 100 based on 14 reviews. On Rotten Tomatoes, it has a 77% approval rating among critics based on 26 reviews, with a rating average of 7.9 out of 10. Verne Gay of Newsday wrote that the series "just gets better and better" and that it has "layered, intricate stories". Robert Rorke of the New York Post praised the performances of Michael Sheen and Lizzy Caplan.

Accolades 
For the 68th Primetime Emmy Awards, Allison Janney was nominated for Outstanding Guest Actress in a Drama Series.

References

External links
 

2015 American television seasons
Television series set in 1965
Television series set in 1966
Television series set in 1967
Television series set in 1968